List of Russian armies in World War I

This page is a list of Russian army formations existing during World War I.

 1st Army 
 2nd Army 
 3rd Army 
 4th Army 
 5th Army 
 6th Army
 7th Army
 8th Army
 9th Army
 10th Army
 11th Army
 12th Army
 13th Army
 Caucasus Army
 Dobruja Army
 Danube Army
 Special Army

See also 
 List of armies
 Imperial Russian Army formations and units (1914)

Russian Empire in World War I
Russia
Military units and formations of Russia in World War I
Military of the Russian Empire
Armies of the Russian Empire
Lists of Russian and Soviet military units and formations